Rocktoberfest Borneo is a music festival focusing on rock, heavy metal and hardcore music, held for the first time on 6 and 7 October 2017, at the beachfront of Parkcity Everly Hotel in Miri, Malaysia. Primarily focused on rock and metal on the two main stages, the 2017 Rocktoberfest Borneo edition featured some of Malaysia and Southeast Asia's influential rock music acts.

History
The 2017 Rocktoberfest Borneo edition was made up of two-day festivals in Miri, Sarawak. Supported by the Miri City Council and Sarawak Tourism Board, Northeastern Group was responsible for the inception and organization of the festival, inviting over 30 bands, including acts from the Philippines, Singapore and Brunei.

2017

Line up

See also
Rock festivals

References

External links

Festivals in Malaysia
Events in Sarawak